The West Gate Freeway is a major freeway in Melbourne, the busiest urban freeway and the busiest road in Australia, carrying upwards of 200,000 vehicles per day. It links Geelong (via the Princes Freeway) and Melbourne's western suburbs to central Melbourne and beyond. It is also a link between Melbourne and the west and linking industrial and residential areas west of the Yarra River with the city and port areas. The West Gate Bridge is a part of the freeway.

It is a fully managed freeway with a complete 'Freeway Management System' that is dynamically linked and adaptive to the entire M1 corridor. This includes the 2008 re-design of a substantial section. Overall, the freeway has between 4-6 lanes in each direction, with a maximum of 12 lanes at one point in its width.

Route
The West Gate Freeway officially begins at the West Gate Interchange in Laverton North, with ramps to and from the Western Ring Road, Princes Freeway and Princes Highway (Geelong Road) and heads east as an eight-lane dual-carriageway, crossing the Yarra River over the West Gate bridge, through Port Melbourne, and then becomes elevated for its remaining length, with access ramps to Melbourne's central business district. Eastward beyond the Kings Way and Power Street exits is the CityLink's Southern Link, connecting onwards through Melbourne's south-eastern suburbs through the Burnley and Domain Tunnels.

Standard travel time on the West Gate Freeway in both directions, is 12 minutes: 5 minutes between the Western Ring Road and Williamstown Road, and 7 minutes between Williamstown Road and Kings Way.

The usual peak period travel time, is between 16–27 minutes; however, in times of extreme congestion or traffic accidents, the travel time can well exceed 40 minutes.

History
The Country Roads Board (later VicRoads) was authorised by the government in December 1961 for a study to gather engineering and economic data for the provisioning of a toll crossing of the Lower Yarra River, from Salmon Street in Port Melbourne to the Princes Highway in the vicinity of Kororoit Creek, a distance of 5.25 miles. Investigations included details of bores down to 8,000 feet and soil tests (completed on 29 June 1962), selective drilling and sampling in critical areas, and traffic studies, and at the time both a tunnel under and a bridge over the river were mooted. In February 1966, the Board was appointed as the design and construction authority for the Lower Yarra Crossing Project; the State government authorised the construction of a tolled bridge over the Yarra with eight lanes.

Construction began on the first section of the Lower Yarra Freeway in the late 1960s and was open to traffic by 1971, stretching from the Princes Highway just south of the intersection with Little Boundary Road in Laverton North (later enlarged and named the West Gate Interchange) eastwards to Melbourne/Williamstown Roads just west of the mouth of the Yarra. At the time, the only way to cross the Yarra west of the CBD was via a ferry crossing (the Yarra River punt service), which naturally saw far heavier demands once the Lower Yarra Freeway was officially opened.

The West Gate Bridge across the Yarra had started construction not too long before the opening of the freeway and, although delayed, when finally completed in 1978 allowed the freeway to extend over the river and directly into the CBD's south-western corner (via Rogers and Lorimer Streets). The freeway's name was changed to the West Gate Freeway to commemorate its opening, but the freeway also attracted tolls from anyone using the bridge (between Melbourne/Williamstown Road and Rogers Street) between 16 November 1978 and 17 November 1985. The toll plaza was located on the city side of the bridge where the service stations are now located. National Route 1 - previously designated along Geelong Road (Princes Highway West) and through the CBD via Smithfield and Flemington Roads and King Street - was altered to use the freeway instead and rejoin Kings Way via Rogers, Lorimer and Clarendon Streets. As a result of the diverted traffic over the West Gate Bridge, the Yarra River punt service closed in 1979.

Due to the extra traffic the West Gate Freeway was attracting—and due to the safety concerns of having excess traffic filter through connector streets in South Melbourne—the freeway was first extended to Johnson Street (today Montague Street) in 1985, and then finally to Kings Way above the Grant Street intersection using elevated carriageways; the eastbound carriageway opened in 1987, and the westbound carriageway opened nearly a year later in 1988. Expansion of the original two lane freeway on the western side of the bridge to three lanes each way was carried out in 1991, and expansion to four lanes followed in 2000. With the subsequent completion of the Western Ring Road joining the West Gate Interchange to the freeway's west and CityLink to the freeway's east, it also funnels traffic from northern and western suburbs around Melbourne, acting as a bypass freeway.

The Lower Yarra Freeway was signed Freeway Route 82 upon opening in 1971, joined by National Route 1 when the West Gate Bridge opened in 1978, and both were extended onto new sections of the West Gate Freeway as they opened during the 1980s; Freeway Route 82 was eventually removed in 1988. Tourist Route 2 also runs along the freeway from the Melbourne/Williamstown Road interchange in Spotswood and the Montague Street interchange in Port Melbourne. With Victoria's conversion to the newer alphanumeric system in the late 1990s, the freeway's National Route 1 designation began conversion to M1 in late 1996, and was completed in 1997.

The passing of the Road Management Act 2004 granted the responsibility of overall management and development of Victoria's major arterial roads to VicRoads: in 2007, VicRoads re-declared this road as West Gate Freeway (Freeway #1820), from the Princes Freeway at Laverton North and ending at the ramps to Kings Way and Power Street in Southbank.

The original Lower Yarra Freeway was officially designated in the 1969 Melbourne Transportation Plan as the F9 Freeway corridor.

Timeline of construction
1971 - Lower Yarra Freeway, initial  opened from Princes Highway to Williamstown Road on 7 April 1971, originally 3 lanes in each direction, at a cost of $14 million.
1978 - West Gate Bridge, opened 15 November 1978, by the Premier, the Hon. R J Hamer ED, MP; with freeway extension from the bridge to Rogers Street
1985 - Tolls removed from West Gate Bridge, 17 November 1985
1985 - Extended 1.5km from Rogers Street to Johnson Street, opened December 1985
1987 - Extended 2.1km from Johnson Street to Kings Way, single carriageway eastbound, opened December 1987
1988 - Extended 2.1km from Johnson Street to Kings Way, single carriageway westbound, opened October 1988; total cost for both carriageways to Kings Way/Power Street $185 million
1991 – Widening to three lanes in both directions between Princes Highway and Millers Road. (this possibly conflicts with information given in CRB's 58th Annual Report, which states the freeway opened with three lanes in each direction in 1971, whilst omitting that the third lane only existed between Millers Road and Williamstown Road).
2000 – Widening to four lanes in both directions between the West Gate Bridge and Laverton.

2008-11 upgrade
Traffic volumes on the West Gate Freeway have grown steadily since opening, carrying up to 180,000 vehicles every day. Congestion frequently occurs at the Montague Street and Bolte Bridge interchanges due to conflicting traffic movements on and off the freeway. On 1 May 2008 the Minister for Roads and Ports Tim Pallas announced design details for the West Gate Freeway improvements, to assist in maintaining rapidly growing volume capacity and to reduce congestion.

They are:
 a full freeway management system, made up of Ramp Metering (Signalling), Lane Use Management Signs (overhead lane availability / variable speed zones), electronic on-road message signs, arterial road message signs, CCTV cameras and a suite of freeway traffic algorithms and software with data stations, thousands of sensors and a core server at the VicRoads TMC.
 the addition of a new elevated road structure joining the outbound Kings Way on-ramp to the Freeway
 new traffic ramps over Montague Street
 an additional dedicated exit ramp from the Bolte Bridge to the Freeway
 widening of the freeway between Todd Road and Montague Street
 redesign of the Montague Street interchange.

These works help reduce merging and weaving movements at key points on the freeway, leading to a smoother traffic flow and improved driver safety. As part of the works the Montague Street on-ramp city bound had been closed for approximately 18 months to enable the new one to be built.

Early works on the West Gate Freeway, including geo-technical investigations and service proving, commenced in late 2007. In early 2008 construction works started on the freeway widening, specifically in the South Melbourne area. New traffic lanes and ramps have been completed and opened in different stages with the total project eventually completed and opened to traffic in June 2011. The project was awarded the 2011 Australian Construction Achievement Award.

Exits and interchanges

Freeway map

Future tolls
When West Gate Tunnel opens to traffic in 2024, heavy commercial vehicles will be tolled on the section of the West Gate Freeway between Millers Road and Hyde Street. These tolls also automatically cover the use of West Gate Tunnel and its connector roads to the city, or the new Hyde Street on and off-road ramps, without incurring additional tolls. The freeway tolls will still be charged to heavy vehicles not using tunnel or Hyde Street ramps, such as entering or exiting at Williamstown Road or using the West Gate Bridge.

Other vehicles will not be tolled on the West Gate Freeway unless accessing the West Gate Tunnel or Hyde Street ramps.

The proposed toll prices shown in the table below are 2022 prices.

See also

 Freeways in Australia
 Freeways in Melbourne
 Road transport in Victoria
 West Gate Bridge

References

 West Gate Freeway at Main Roads Victoria

External links
 West Gate Bridge Memorial Committee
 Construction image gallery
 Monash-CityLink-West Gate upgrade

Highways and freeways in Melbourne
Former toll roads in Australia
Transport in Geelong
Highway 1 (Australia)
Transport in the City of Wyndham
Transport in the City of Hobsons Bay